The 2012 Idaho Vandals football team represented the University of Idaho in the 2012 NCAA Division I FBS football season. The Vandals were led by sixth-year head coach Robb Akey for the first eight games and played their home games on campus at the Kibbie Dome. This was Idaho's final season as a member of the Western Athletic Conference;  the WAC ceased to support football after the 2012 season, and Idaho played as an independent in football in 2013.

After achieving a 20–50 record while head coach and a 1–7 record in 2012, Akey's contract was terminated on October 21. First-year offensive coordinator Jason Gesser was appointed interim head coach for the final four games, in which the Vandals were winless.

Idaho finished the season 1–11, 1–5 in conference to finish in sixth place in the seven-team WAC. On December 3, Paul Petrino was hired as head coach for the 2013 season.

Schedule

Game summaries

Eastern Washington

@ Bowling Green

@ LSU

Wyoming

@ North Carolina

New Mexico State

@ Texas State

@ Louisiana Tech

San Jose State

@ BYU

UTSA

@ Utah State

NFL Draft
No Vandals were selected in the 2013 NFL Draft, but defensive end Benson Mayowa made the opening day roster of the Seattle Seahawks as a rookie free agent.

References

Idaho
Idaho Vandals football seasons
Idaho Vandals football